Dhar Junction railway station will be a small railway station in Dhar district, Madhya Pradesh. Its code is DHAR. It will serve Dhar city. The station will consist of two platforms. The station will lie on the Chhota Udaipur–Dhar line which comes under the Ratlam railway division of Western Railway.

References

Railway stations in Dhar district
Ratlam railway division